Preston is an unincorporated community in Jasper County, in the U.S. state of Missouri.

History
A post office called Preston was established in 1860, and remained in operation until 1880. The community has the name of an original owner of the site.

References

Unincorporated communities in Jasper County, Missouri
Unincorporated communities in Missouri